Dusty Trails is the self-titled debut album by the American music duo Dusty Trails. It was released on May 9, 2000, by Atlantic Records.

Track listing
All music by Dusty Trails, lyrics by Vivian Trimble, except where otherwise indicated.

"Pearls on a String" – 2:52
"You Freed Yourself" (Lyrics: Laura Graham) – 3:10
"Spy in the Lounge" (Music: Dusty Trails, Dave Grusin, Stephen Stills) – 3:39
"Est-Ce Que Tu" – 3:59
"Roll the Dice" (Lyrics: Jill Cunniff, Trimble) – 3:10
"St-Tropez" – 4:14
"Unhand Me You Wretch" – 0:47
"They May Call Me a Dreamer" – 2:58
"Fool for a Country Tune" – 3:13
"Regrets in Bordertown" – 3:55
"Order Coffee" – 3:35
"Conga Style" (Music: Dusty Trails, Willie Cooper, Quincy Jones, Ernie Shelby) – 1:58
"Caught in a Dream" – 2:42
"Dusty Trails Theme" (Music: Dusty Trails, Cooper, Jones, Shelby) – 3:19

Personnel
Dusty Trails
Vivian Trimble – keyboards, keyboard strings, lead and backing vocals, accordion, acoustic guitar
Josephine Wiggs – electric and upright bass, guitars, drums, bongos, percussion, backing vocals, vibe keyboards ("Est-Ce Que Tu")

Additional musicians
Jon Mattock – conga, percussion ("You Freed Yourself")
Audu Obaje – Elgam organ ("You Freed Yourself")
Josh Roseman – trombone ("Spy in the Lounge")
Jill Cunniff – vocals, acoustic guitar ("Roll the Dice")
Sarah Cox – bass guitar ("Roll the Dice")
Kate Schellenbach – drums ("St-Tropez", "They May Call Me a Dreamer")
Emmylou Harris – lead vocals ("Order Coffee")

Technical
Dusty Trails – producer
Josephine Wiggs – engineer, mixing
Leon Zervos – mastering
Martin Ogolter – art direction, design
Sarah Press – photography
Basia Zomorska – stylist
Gabriel Trujillo – hair, make-up

References

2000 debut albums
Dusty Trails albums
Atlantic Records albums